Edward George McGregor (born March 29, 1973) is an American serial killer who raped and murdered four women in the Greater Houston area between 1990 and 2006. With the use of DNA evidence, McGregor was arrested in 2006 for one of the murders, with the other crimes being linked to him as well. After a trial in 2010, McGregor was found guilty and sentenced to life imprisonment.

Murders

Kim Wildman 
At approximately 11:45 p.m. on April 17, 1990, the Missouri City police department received a frantic 911 call from a woman identifying herself as Kim Louis Wildman, 38. Wildman reportedly was crying out for help claiming to have been stabbed multiple times in her home. The call abruptly ended, and police cars hurriedly drove to her home. When they arrived, they forced themselves in and found her nude body on the kitchen floor. Since Wildman did not identify the attacker during the call, the recording was forwarded to the FBI for further investigation. At the same time, Missouri City detectives investigated Wildman's neighbors, one of them was Edward McGregor, Wildman's 17-year-old neighbor who lived two houses down. Since police had no evidence against him, and McGregor himself denied responsibility, the case stalled and the only piece of evidence of the perpetrator was a singular DNA sample. The case went cold after a few years.

Edwina Barnum 
On May 25, 1994, at approximately 2:20 am, the neighbors of Edwina Latriss Barnum, 23, noticed her apartment door was slightly ajar. Upon realizing it had been kicked in they contacted the apartment management and entered the apartment. In the bathroom they located her dead body. Responding officers arrived, and along with a subsequent autopsy, they concluded that the killer had used a belt to strangle Barnum to death. They also stated that she had been murdered a few hours beforehand, likely when she returned home from work, and that killer had followed her back to the apartment. Investigators had struggled to find potential suspects, and the case went cold. In 2004, on the ten-year anniversary of the murder, Barnum's mother, Betty Gregory, contacted the Houston Police Department pleading for a re-investigation. In a press conference for the ten-year anniversary, Gregory requested the department to open its own cold case unit.

Danielle Subjects 
At around 1 p.m. on August 5, 2005, the roommates of 28-year-old Danielle Subjects returned home from a night out at a friend's house, but they discovered her dead body. Subjects had earlier dropped off her two children at a daycare for the day, before returning home. An autopsy showed that she was killed at around 10:30 am, and that the killer raped her. He also took valuables from the house and left, leaving only his DNA behind.

Mandy Rubin 
In the morning hours of February 4, 2006, at approximately 11:50 am, friends who came to visit 25-year-old Mandy Rubin in her apartment noticed that her door was unlocked. They called security personnel who arrived and entered. Officers found Rubin's dead body in her bathroom. No signs of forced entry were found during the investigation, but investigators suspected that due to marks on the body, Rubin likely fought with her killer. She too was sexually assaulted.

Arrest and investigation 
On May 2, 2006, McGregor was arrested for Wildman's murder. Based on DNA evidence, they matched his DNA with the killer's DNA samples he left at Wildman's home. In the sixteen years after the murder, McGregor had lived quietly in the Houston area, was never arrested for any crime and had obtained work as a UPS delivery man. While in jail, police announced he was a suspect in the Subjects and Rubin murders due to his movements and similarities with the Wildman case. McGregor was held on $1,000,000 bail, which was later reduced to $250,000 which he posted, and he was released from police custody in May 2006. On December 1 he was re-arrested after his DNA was matched to Barnum's murder. For this he was jailed with a $750,000 bond.

During his incarceration, McGregor was housed with a cellmate named Adam Osani. According to Osani, McGregor would often insult and fight him. On one occasion Osani claimed that a neighboring cellmate, Marvin Paxton, yelled at McGregor to leave Osani alone to which, according to both Paxton and Osani, McGregor blurted out "Bitch, I'll kill you like I did to those other two bitches". Police obtained cell phone records to try to connect McGregor to the Subjects and Rubin murders and discovered that McGregor had called both shortly before they were killed.

Trial and imprisonment 
McGregor was only prosecuted in Wildman's murder, and he went to trial in 2010. Since McGregor was only 17 years old at the time of murder, prosecutors could not seek the death penalty and instead sought a life sentence. Despite the overwhelming evidence, including his alleged confession, McGregor openly stated that he was innocent. His family members believed him and took the stand during his trial. McGregor's brother, Tesfa, stated that on the night Wildman was killed, he and McGregor were up playing video games. In Tesfa's statements, he said he "dozed off" at around 11:00 p.m. and woke up later that night to hear some loud talking coming from outside. He claimed he saw McGregor enter his room and stated he was wearing the same clothes as he was earlier that night with no signs of a struggle, blood evidence, and any noticeable marks on his body.

McGregor's mother Sonia, also testified on her son's behalf. She stated the same story Tesfa did, but also claimed that McGregor had flirted with Wildman in the days leading up to her murder. She also said that McGregor reported having sex with Wildman, even though he was 17, and had been invited into her house on multiple occasions. Another witness, Delores Lee, who was serving time in prison for solicitation of capital murder testified that she lived across the street from Wildman in 1990 and stated that she overheard McGregor confess to the crime to himself. She claimed she only came out with this information now was due to the fact she had cancer. McGregor was found guilty and sentenced to life in prison with a minimum of 15 years served.

In September 2016, McGregor and his lawyers requested a new trial. McGregor, who was still persisting he was innocent, argued that the DNA evidence was weak and circumstantial, and that the witnesses who testified against him should not have been trusted as they were convicted criminals. Later in November they also argued that one of the main witnesses against McGregor, Delores Lee, had fabricated her entire story. It was found that Lee did not live across from Wildman, nor did she have cancer, making all of her testimony questionable. McGregor had said that he had never known Lee and stated in a videotaped interview from 2009 "It's easy to go on TV and say these things, but remember you have to be able to prove them".

In November 2019 the main prosecutor in the case, Elizabeth Exley, was sanctioned for misconduct after it was discovered that she had spoken to McGregor's cellmates for information and failed to tell his defense attorneys about it. Exley claimed that, while she did fail to communicate with defense attorneys during the trial, McGregor nevertheless received a fair trial, and that's why his appeal was denied. She also claimed that what she did was not done in malicious intent, but it was done to ensure that a serial killer would remain behind bars for the rest of his life.

See also 
 List of serial killers in the United States

References 

1973 births
20th-century American criminals
American male criminals
American people convicted of murder
American rapists
American serial killers
Living people
Male serial killers
People convicted of murder by Texas
Prisoners sentenced to life imprisonment by Texas
Violence against women in the United States